Đorđe Cenić (6 February 1825, in Belgrade – 7 October 1903, in Vienna) was a Serbian politician, lawyer, professor and academic.

Biography
Born to a family of Dimitrije Cenić, a prominent trader based in Belgrade, Cenić was awarded a state scholarship and went on to study in Berlin, Heidelberg and Halle (Saale). After studies Cenić returned to Serbia and became a professor at modern-day University of Belgrade Faculty of Law.

At the age of 29 Cenić became the president of regional court in Smederevo, and later in Belgrade. After his work in a number of courts, Cenić became a government minister, serving as the Prime Minister of Serbia and the Minister of Justice in four terms. He made several reforms in attempt to modernise the country and is responsible for a number of modern laws resembling those of other European countries. Cenić abolished corporal punishment in Serbia.

Cenić was awarder Order of the Cross of Takovo, Order of White Eagle and Order of Miloš the Great. He bestowed his personal library to University of Belgrade Faculty of Law.

References

1825 births
1903 deaths
Government ministers of Serbia
19th-century Serbian people
Justice ministers of Serbia